The Wabtec FLXDrive platform (pronounced "Flex-Drive") is a class of Battery-electric locomotives manufactured by Wabtec's GE Transportation subsidiary beginning in 2019. Using a modified version of the GE Evolution Series platform, FLXdrive is Wabtec's first zero-emissions locomotive, storing power in 20 racks of lithium-ion battery cells. FLXDrive is a hybrid-electric locomotive, meaning it works in conjunction with traditional diesel-electric locomotives to provide regenerative braking for a train. The locomotives are capable of up to half an hour of operation on their own batteries when not connected to another locomotive.

The first locomotive, number 3000, was successfully tested on BNSF Railway in 2021 and found to reduce fuel consumption when paired with conventional diesel-electric locomotives. Since 2020, FLXDrive locomotives have been ordered by Union Pacific, Canadian National, Rio Tinto, BHP, and Roy Hill. The first locomotives are scheduled to enter service in 2023.

In 2022, Wabtec announced a line of battery-electric locomotives including 6-axle, 4-axle, and foreign market variants. Wabtec plans to market the FLXDrive in tandem with hydrogen powered locomotives, allowing the two types to complement each other.

Customers

References

External links

 FLXdrive

C-C locomotives
Freight locomotives
Standard gauge locomotives of the United States
Railway locomotives introduced in 2019